Elections to Stevenage Borough Council were held on 3 May 2012. One third of the council were elected; the seats which were last contested in 2008. 

The composition of the council after the election was:
Labour 30
Conservative 6
Liberal Democrat 3

Election result

Ward Results

Bandley Hill

Bedwell

Chells

Longmeadow

Manor

Martins Wood

Old Town

Pin Green

Roebuck

St Nicholas

Shephall

Symonds Green

Woodfield

References

2012
2012 English local elections
2010s in Hertfordshire